Victorlemoinea is an extinct litoptern genus of the family Sparnotheriodontidae, that lived from the Early to Middle Eocene. Fossils of Victorlemoinea have been found in the Las Flores, Sarmiento and Koluel Kaike Formations of Argentina, the Itaboraí Formation of Brazil and La Meseta Formation, Antarctica.

Description 
Victorlemoinea was a medium-sized litoptern. Litopterns would not retain such sizes again until the Miocene.

Taxonomy 
This animal is considered a member of the family Sparnotheriodontidae and is said to share some features with the mammal family Didolodontidae. Fossils referable to the genus have been found on Seymour Island, Antarctica.

Victorlemoinea was first named by Florentino Ameghino in 1901 on the basis of a mandible and teeth from the Sarmiento Formation of Argentina, with the type species being Victorlemoinea labyrinthica.
In 1952, Carlos de Paula Couto named a new species of Victorlemoinea from the Itaboraí Formation of Brazil, V. prototypica. In 1983, Richard Cifelli tentatively synonymized Sparnotheriodon with Victorlemoinea,  however, many other authors view the former as distinct.

The following cladogram is based on Chimento & Agnolin, 2020, showing the position of Victorlemoinea.

References 

Condylarths
Sparnotheriodontids
Eocene mammals of South America
Itaboraian
Casamayoran
Mustersan
Divisaderan
Paleogene Argentina
Fossils of Argentina
Paleogene Brazil
Fossils of Brazil
Cenozoic mammals of Antarctica
Paleogene Antarctica
Fossils of Antarctica
Fossil taxa described in 1901
Taxa named by Florentino Ameghino
Prehistoric placental genera
Golfo San Jorge Basin
Itaboraí Formation
Sarmiento Formation